Dover is a city in Tuscarawas County, Ohio, United States, along the Tuscarawas River. The population was 13,112 at the 2020 census. It is a principal city of the New Philadelphia–Dover micropolitan area, approximately 
south of Cleveland.

History
Originally named Canal Dover due to its location and origins along the Ohio and Erie Canal, the land was platted in 1807, with Christian Deardorff and Jesse Slingluff recognized as the founders.  Beginning in 1815, the post office first began operation.  Canal Dover incorporated as a village in 1842 and became a city under the Ohio municipal code of 1903.  On February 12, 1916, the city officially changed its name to Dover.

Geography
Dover is located at  (40.526545, -81.477769), along the Tuscarawas River, near the mouth of Sugar Creek.

Demographics

2010 census
As of the census of 2010, there were 12,826 people, 5,181 households, and 3,297 families living in the city. The racial makeup of the city was 94.1% White, 1.1% African American, 0.6% Native American, 0.5% Asian, 0.7% Pacific Islander, 1.7% from other races, and 1.4% from two or more races. Hispanic or Latino of any race were 4.1% of the population.

There were 5,181 households, of which 28.5% had children under the age of 18 living with them, 49.7% were married couples living together, 9.8% had a female householder with no husband present, 4.1% had a male householder with no wife present, and 36.4% were non-families. 31.6% of all households were made up of individuals, and 15.6% had someone living alone who was 65 years of age or older. The average household size was 2.37 and the average family size was 2.96.

The median age in the city was 42.9 years. 22.3% of residents were under the age of 18; 7.3% were between the ages of 18 and 24; 22.9% were from 25 to 44; 25.6% were from 45 to 64; and 22% were 65 years of age or older. The gender makeup of the city was 47.4% male and 52.6% female.

2000 census
As of the census of 2000, there were 12,210 people, 4,996 households, and 3,362 families living in the city. The population density was 2,319.6 people per square mile (896.3/km2). There were 5,233 housing units at an average density of 994.2 per square mile (384.1/km2). The racial makeup of the city was 97.09% White, 1.27% African American, 0.25% Native American, 0.51% Asian, 0.02% Pacific Islander, 0.20% from other races, and 0.66% from two or more races. Hispanic or Latino of any race were 0.60% of the population.

There were 4,996 households, out of which 30.2% had children under the age of 18 living with them, 54.4% were married couples living together, 10.0% had a female householder with no husband present, and 32.7% were non-families. 28.8% of all households were made up of individuals, and 14.9% had someone living alone who was 65 years of age or older. The average household size was 2.39 and the average family size was 2.94.

In the city, the population was spread out, with 24.1% under the age of 18, 6.7% from 18 to 24, 26.8% from 25 to 44, 22.5% from 45 to 64, and 19.9% who were 65 years of age or older. The median age was 40 years. For every 100 females, there were 86.9 males. For every 100 females age 18 and over, there were 83.1 males.

The median income for a household in the city was $36,665, and the median income for a family was $44,604. Males had a median income of $34,579 versus $22,397 for females. The per capita income for the city was $18,928. About 7.5% of families and 9.2% of the population were below the poverty line, including 11.1% of those under age 18 and 9.7% of those age 65 or over.

Arts and culture
Dover is adjacent to New Philadelphia, the county seat of Tuscarawas County, with the two cities considered twin cities. Each year, the "Crimson Tornadoes" of Dover High School play the rival "Quakers" of New Philadelphia in a football game that has been played annually for more than a century, and is the fourth longest-running football rivalry in the state of Ohio.

Notable people
 Hunter Armstrong, Olympic swimmer, Men's 4 × 100 Gold medal winner at Tokyo 2020
 Elwyn Berlekamp, mathematician
 James R. Black, actor and former National Football League player for the Cleveland Browns
 Frank Ellwood, former head football coach of Marshall University and Georgia Southern University
 Percival "Perci" Garner, III, Major League Baseball player for the Cleveland Indians  (2016)
 Vic Gilliam,  member of the Oregon House of Representatives and actor
 Ernie Godfrey, college football coach and College Football Hall of Fame inductee
 Theophil Hildebrandt, mathematician
 Joseph C. Hisrich, educator and member of the Wisconsin State Assembly
 Monty Hunter, former National Football League player for the Dallas Cowboys and St. Louis Cardinals
 Frank "Doc" Kelker, college football All-American
 Al Landis, member of the Ohio House of Representatives
 Al Mays, 19th-century Major League Baseball pitcher
 Ray Mears, college basketball coach at the University of Tennessee
 Elliott Nugent, playwright, producer, and actor
 Bob Peterson, animator, screenwriter, and director at Pixar
 William Quantrill, guerrilla fighter, American Civil War
 Trevor J. Rees, former Kent State Golden Flashes head football coach and athletic director
 Allan Sayre, former member of the Ohio House of Representatives
 Mark Dean Schwab, child rapist and murderer 
 Zack Space, former member of the United States House of Representatives
 Herald F. Stout, admiral in the United States Navy during World War II and namesake of the USS Stout.
 Al Veigel, former Major League Baseball player for the Boston Bees during the 1939 season
 Stan White, former National Football League player for the Baltimore Colts and Detroit Lions.
 Johnny Wilson, former National Football League player for the Cleveland Rams

References

External links

 City of Dover
 Tuscarawas County History
 Northeast Ohio Travel - History of Dover
 Dover Public Library

Cities in Tuscarawas County, Ohio
Populated places established in 1806
German-American culture in Ohio
Cities in Ohio